Sainte Marie Township is one of eleven townships in Jasper County, Illinois, United States. As of the 2010 census, its population was 551 and it contained 264 housing units.

Geography

Cities, towns, villages
 Ste. Marie
 Rafetown

Adjacent townships
 Willow Hill Township - north
 Oblong Township, Crawford County - northeast
 Martin Township, Crawford County - east
 Southwest Township, Crawford County - east
 German Township, Richland County - south
 Preston Township, Richland County - southwest
 Fox Township - west

Cemeteries
 St. Mary's Assumption
 Collins/Faltmier
 Ste Marie City
 St. Valentine/South Bend
 Yager

Rivers
 Dead River
 Embarras River

School districts
 Jasper County Community Unit School District 1
 Oblong Community Unit School District 4

Political districts
 Illinois's 19th congressional district
 State House District 108
 State Senate District 54

References
 
 United States Census Bureau 2007 TIGER/Line Shapefiles
 United States National Atlas

External links
 City-Data.com
 Illinois State Archives

Townships in Jasper County, Illinois
1859 establishments in Illinois
Populated places established in 1859
Townships in Illinois